Cat's claw or cat's claws (also uña de gato or unha de gato in Spanish or Portuguese) is a common name for several plants:

 Acacia greggii, a tree species native to the southwestern United States and northern Mexico
 Acacia plumosa, a plant species native to Brazil
 Carpobrotus edulis, or uña de gato (Spanish: "cat's claw"), a plant species in the family Aizoaceae
 Dolichandra unguis-cati, or cat's claw creeper, a Central American climbing vine of the family Bignoniaceae
 Grevillea alpina, a shrub species native to Australia
 Martynia annua, a plant species endemic to Brazil
 Mimosa nuttallii (formerly Schrankia nuttalli), a plant native to the Midwestern United States
 Uncaria guianensis, a plant species found in Guyana and used in traditional medicine
 Uncaria rhynchophylla, a plant species used in traditional Chinese medicine
 Uncaria tomentosa, a plant species found in the tropical jungles of South and Central America and used in traditional medicine